Brian Joseph Michael Cotter, Baron Cotter (born 24 August 1936) is a politician in the United Kingdom. He was Liberal Democrat Member of Parliament for Weston-super-Mare from 1997 to 2005.

Early life
Born in London, the son of a doctor from Weston-super-Mare, he was educated at Saint Benedict's School, Ealing, and Downside School in Somerset, where, aged sixteen, he ran a 4½ minute mile. Upon leaving school, he entered the British Army, serving two years National Service, spending time stationed in West Germany. He entered business after leaving the army. He studied Business Studies at a polytechnic in London, eventually running his own small manufacturing company, Plasticable Ltd in Alton, which is now run as a co-operative.

Formerly a Conservative, as he stated in Woking Liberal/SDP Alliance general election campaign newspaper The Voice in 1987, Brian Cotter was elected to Woking Borough Council in 1986, as a Liberal/SDP Alliance candidate, representing the Mount Hermon West ward. He retained this seat until standing down in 1990.

Parliamentary career
In 1997, he was the first Member of Parliament for Weston-super-Mare to not be from the Conservative Party since 1923. He had contested the same seat in 1992 without success. He was re-elected in 2001, but Cotter lost the seat to John Penrose of the Conservatives at the 2005 general election. Throughout his time in Parliament, he served as Small Business Spokesman for the Liberal Democrats.

In April 2006, it was announced that Cotter would be created a life peer to join the Liberal Democrat ranks in the House of Lords, and on 30 May he was created Baron Cotter, of Congresbury in the County of Somerset. He delivered his maiden speech in the Lords on 29 June.

He takes an interest in a number of areas, and on various issues as they arise. Specifically, before the coalition government was formed in 2010, he led for the Liberal Democrats on Small Business issues and vocational education; specifically apprenticeships. Within the coalition, he concentrated on business and vocational training issues.

Outside Parliament

Baron Cotter is a practising Roman Catholic. Cotter is a patron of domestic violence charity the ManKind Initiative.

Personal life
He married Eyleen Patricia Wade in February 1963. They have two sons and a daughter.

References

External links
 Cotter's profile at the site of Liberal Democrats
 Weston-super-Mare Liberal Democrats
 Guardian Politics Ask Aristotle - Brian Cotter
 TheyWorkForYou.com - Brian Cotter
 The Public Whip - Brian Cotter voting record
 BBC News - Brian Cotter profile 16 October 2002

1936 births
Living people
People educated at Downside School
Liberal Democrats (UK) MPs for English constituencies
Liberal Democrats (UK) life peers
UK MPs 1997–2001
UK MPs 2001–2005
People from Weston-super-Mare
Conservative Party (UK) politicians
People educated at St Benedict's School, Ealing
ManKind Initiative people
British Army soldiers
Liberal Democrats (UK) councillors
Life peers created by Elizabeth II